Kuchaman City railway station is a railway station established in Narayanpura village which is 9 km away from kuchaman city  in Nagaur district, Rajasthan. Its code is KMNC. It provides railway services to Kuchaman City and all near small villages. The station consists of a single platform. Passenger, Express, and Superfast trains halt here.

Nagaur and jodhpur are connected to jaipur by this station.

Transport facility between station and Kuchaman- 1). there is a specifically serviced bus, which is active whole day on the road according to the train's departure  and arrival to facilitate the passengers. 2). Narayanpura is situated on the highway that connects kuchaman to ajmer, so Rsrtc buses and private busses stops there and can be used in transportation.

References

Railway stations in Nagaur district
Jodhpur railway division